KISO (96.1 MHz, "96.1 KISS-FM") is a Top 40 (CHR) FM radio station in Omaha, Nebraska owned by iHeartMedia. KISO is licensed by the U.S. Federal Communications Commission (FCC) to broadcast in the HD (hybrid) format. KISO's studios are located near North 50th Street and Underwood Avenue in Midtown Omaha, while its transmitter is located at North 72nd Street and Crown Point at the Omaha master antenna farm.

History

KCOM, KICN, KOIL-FM and KEFM
96.1 had a rocky history, but was successful in Omaha radio for nearly two decades, before it joined the Clear Channel group.  Beginning in Council Bluffs, 96.1 made its biggest splash across the river.

The change of city was made after a station known as KFAM had gone dark. (This was probably KFMX Council Bluffs which switched off in 1952. OmahaRadioHistory.com) In 1959, a station known as KCOM surfaced at 96.1 when a couple of hobbyist-types used the frequency to broadcast classical music, with an Omaha license. Their studios were in the Rorick Apartments with a tower on top of the building, where it remained through the Burden years until toppled in the 1980 storm.

During the Burden years, KICN was the FM sister to KOIL.  Although a simulcast with KOIL, the KICN call letters were being preserved from Burden's Denver property on 710 that didn't succeed and was sold off.  During this time, 1290 KOIL was going through the roof as AM's heyday continued in Omaha radio.

In 1967, the call letters KOIL-FM were adopted.  With call letters now matching its sister, KOIL-FM became one of the standard "Beautiful Music" formats  on  FM dials across the country.  It was not until 1974 that it would resume its own identity as KEFM.

A new license
In 1976, the Burden stations were shut down by the FCC, but KEFM returned to broadcasting in December of that same year with the same Beautiful Music format. Same month, two years later, KEFM switched to "New Country".  By 1980, KEFM was positioning itself as "96-
One".  That same year, KEFM's tower fell to the ground due to a storm.

Return to air/AC format
On October 21, 1983, KEFM went back on the air, which began 20 years under the ownership of the Webster family, and returned with an adult contemporary format as "Lite 96."

A slight repositioning of "Lite 96" was made in the late 1990s, when the station became "Mix 96.1".   Then, when John Webster decided to get out of the radio business (almost 20 years to the date of KEFM's resurrection), the sale of KEFM to iHeartMedia (then known as Clear Channel Communications) was approved. Webster left with $10 million. Clear Channel obtained Omaha's last locally owned, stand-alone commercial FM station.

KQBW
Clear Channel's attempts to rebuild the slow erosion of KEFM's audience failed, and at 5 a.m. on September 22, 2005, an "All Christmas" format was launched as a stunt. (KEFM had done an all Christmas music format prior to Thanksgiving in 2004.)

The next afternoon, at 4:00 p.m., KEFM flipped to classic rock as "The Brew" using the calls KQBW. The music centered mostly on 1980s rock, with core artists like Aerosmith, Bon Jovi, Van Halen and AC/DC, while flavoring the format with 1970s bands such as Boston and Lynyrd Skynyrd and 1990s music from acts like Stone Temple Pilots and Pearl Jam.  It also featured a good helping of 1980s pop-rock, such as John Cougar Mellencamp, Bryan Adams, and Pat Benatar. KQBW was one of five radio stations that used "The Brew" branding, alongside sister stations in Oklahoma City, New Orleans, Columbus and Portland, Oregon. It was the second outlet to use the brand after WQBW in Milwaukee (that station has since flipped to Top 40/CHR, and then sports talk).

KQBQ debuted its on-air lineup on October 4, 2005.  It initially consisted of The Morning Brew with Mookie & Michelle (5:30-10am), "Crash" Davis (10am-3pm), "Steve-O" (3–7 pm) and Lucy Chapman (7–11 pm).  The Brew later rounded out its airstaff with weekenders Marty Simpson and "Bam-Bam". On-air features of "The Brew" included "6-Packs of Brew Music", "The 90s At Noon" and "The Friday Free-For-All".

In January 2007, the Brew shuffled its lineup, moving Steve-O to middays, Crash Davis to evenings, and adding afternoon driver Ethan Stone and weekend talent Lester St. James, formerly of the Brew's rival, Z-92.  St. James departed the station in the summer of 2007. Also in January 2007, the station changed its positioning statement from "Everything Rock, the 80s and More" to "The Biggest Variety of Rock Hits", as the focus shifted toward a more expanded playlist of 1990s and even early 2000s music, like Three Doors Down and Creed.

In February 2008, the Brew changed its on-air staff again, shifting Ethan Stone to mornings (joining Michelle as "The New Morning Brew"), moving Mookie to middays, and Crash Davis to afternoons.  Former middayer Steve-O made an unexplained departure.

KISO
On September 2, 2012, at 6:20 p.m., KQBW changed its format to Top 40 (CHR) as "96-1 KISS FM". Simultaneously, the "Brew" name and format moved to their HD2 channel. On September 12, 2012, KQBW changed call letters to KISO to match the "KISS FM" moniker.  On November 11, 2014, the HD2 subchannel was re-launched as "Christmas 94.9". On December 26, 2014, at Midnight, after playing "Rockin' Around the Christmas Tree" by Brenda Lee, the HD2 signal, simulcast on translators 94.9 K235CD and 102.3 K272FE (as well as the latter frequency being simulcasted on 93.3-HD2), flipped to mainstream rock as "Rock 94.9/102.3". The first song on "Rock" was "Cum On Feel the Noize" by Quiet Riot.

HD2 translator

References

External links

Contemporary hit radio stations in the United States
ISO
Radio stations established in 1984
IHeartMedia radio stations
1984 establishments in Nebraska